Iris is an Italian free entertainment television channel, launched on November 30, 2007, operated by Mediaset and owned by MFE - MediaForEurope. It is broadcast in Italy on DTT channel 22 on mux Mediaset 4 .

Iris broadcasts films (mainly author films), cult TV series, and small productions Mediaset, respecting the target network. It is available on digital terrestrial television and digital satellite television through Tivù Sat.

Programming

TV series

Current

 Belli dentro
 Distretto di Polizia
 Renegade
 The Dukes of Hazzard
 Walker, Texas Ranger

Past

24
 Acapulco H.E.A.T.
 Ally McBeal
Chicago Hope
CSI: Crime Scene Investigation
CSI: Miami
 Dark Angel
 Dharma & Greg
 Eight Is Enough
 Ellery Queen
Everwood
Everybody Loves Raymond
 Hunter
Kitchen Confidential
 Knight Rider
 Miami Vice
 Miss Match
 NYPD Blue
 Oz
Peacemakers
 Prison Break
 Point Pleasant
 Queer as Folk
 Quincy, M.E.
Reba
 Reunion
Saved
 Shark
 Six Feet Under
Still Standing
The A-Team
The Big Bang Theory
The Big Valley
The Inside
The Shield
 The Sopranos
 Third Watch
Vanished
 Walker, Texas Ranger
 Windfall

Productions 

 Adesso, cinema! (Now, cinema!, with Marta Perego: interviews, cinema news);
 Alfabeto (Alphabet, with Maurizio Costanzo);
 Io l'ho visto (I saw it, with Carlo Rossella:  the films of the evening are introduced);
 Iris la settimana (Iris the week, newsmagazine);
 Iris ai festival (Iris at festivals);
 Note d'arte (Notes of art, with Daniela Annaro: news about exhibitions and museums);
 Note di cinema (Note of cinema, with Anna Praderio: news services and interviews on Italian and international cinema);
 Parole crociate (Crosswords, game show with Daniele Bossari);
 Scuola di cult (School of cult, with Enrico Tamburini: in-depth analysis of Italian-style comedies);
 Storie di cinema (Stories of cinema, with Tatti Sanguineti: in-depth analysis of directors, actors and screenwriters);
 Ti racconto un libro (I’ll tell you a book, with Christian Mascheroni and Marta Perego).

References

External links
 Official website 

Mediaset television channels
Television channels and stations established in 2007
2007 establishments in Italy
Italian-language television stations
Movie channels